Surveyor-General of New Zealand is a position created in 1840 when New Zealand became a separate colony.

List of surveyors general of New Zealand

References

Lists of British, Australian and New Zealand Surveyors-General, Government Geologists... Retrieved 5 September 2016

Government of New Zealand